Edward John Hughes  D.F.A., D.Litt. (February 17, 1913 – January 5, 2007) was a Canadian painter, known for his images of the land and sea in British Columbia.

Early career
Hughes was born in North Vancouver, British Columbia, Canada, and spent a significant part of his childhood in Nanaimo, British Columbia. Raised during the Depression, he studied at the Vancouver School of Decorative and Applied Art where he graduated in 1933. His talent was recognized early. One of his teachers was Frederick Varley of the Group of Seven, and another member, Lawren Harris, recommended him for the inaugural Emily Carr Scholarship in 1947.

In 1934, he formed a partnership with the muralist Paul Goranson and Orville Fisher in a commercial art firm.

World War II
When World War II began in 1939, he enlisted with the Royal Canadian Artillery as a gunner and was posted to England. From 1943 to 1946, he served as one of Canada's official war artists. Hughes traveled to England and Alaska where he depicted ordinary men caught up in this worldwide event. He produced well over a thousand drawings, many watercolours, oil sketches and almost 30 paintings.
One curator calls his work between 1940 and 1946 for the Canadian war records perhaps the "most significant body of work by a Canadian artist in the Canadian War Museum".

Post-War period
After being discharged from the military in 1946, he returned to the west coast of Canada with his wife Fern and settled in Shawnigan Lake on Vancouver Island, at first concentrated on waterfront subjects near his home. Hughes spent much of the remainder of his life living on Vancouver Island  where he pursued a lifelong study of the province and its landscape as a professional artist.

In the 1950s, Hughes' reputation grew, especially after he signed an exclusive contract to sell all his work to Dr. Max Stern, the owner of the Dominion Gallery in Montreal in 1951. Stern encouraged him to expand his range of subject matter. In 1954, he was one of eighteen Canadian artists commissioned by the Canadian Pacific Railway to paint a mural for the interior of one of the new Park cars entering service on the new Canadian transcontinental train. Each of the murals depicted a different national or provincial park; Hughes' was Tweedsmuir Provincial Park. In 1992, Canada Post used one of his images ("Christie Pass, Hurst Island, B,C.") on a stamp commemorating 125 years of Confederation.

Hughes died of cardiac arrest in Duncan, BC at the age of 93.

Legacy
Hughes' paintings are best known for their strong and appealing images of the landscape and seascape of British Columbia. Jack Shadbolt described Hughes as "the most engaging intuitive painter of the BC landscape since Emily Carr." His distinctive style of painting is marked by the use of flattened space, skewed perspective, and simplified shapes. The paintings combine compelling clarity with a sense of the unknown and an appreciation for his natural surroundings. His sources are many, among them Jan Vermeer, his favorite artist, and the Mexican muralists, such as Diego Rivera.

Hughes was elected to the Royal Canadian Academy of Arts in 1969. Hughes was awarded with Honorary Doctorates from the University of Victoria in 1994 and the Emily Carr Institute of Art and Design in 1997. In 2001, he received the Order of Canada and, in 2005, he was awarded the Order of British Columbia. Both of these awards cited his dedication to representing Canada with passion and originality.

The Vancouver Art Gallery has the most extensive holding of Hughes' work in public hands and mounted a major retrospective exhibition in 2003, curated by Ian M. Thom.

His painting Lake Okanagan was purchased at a rural Ontario yard sale for C$200. Six years later, in 2007, the purchaser sold it at auction for $402,500. In November 2018, his painting Fishboats, River Inlet sold for $2,041,250 CDN (premium included) at the Heffel Auction.

Books 
 E. J. Hughes, by Ian M. Thom (Senior curator, Vancouver Art Gallery). A 226-page hardcover book published by Douglas & McIntyre and the Vancouver Art Gallery in 2002. . This book was the catalogue for the E. J. Hughes exhibition which was seen at the Vancouver Art Gallery and later at the McMichael Canadian Art Collection in Kleinburg, Ontario, and the Art Gallery of Greater Victoria.
 A Journey with E.J. Hughes, By Jacques Barbeau, 2005 180-page hardcover, Douglas & McIntyre. 
E.J. Hughes: The Man and His Art, by Jane G. Cole (Art Professor, Vancouver Island University), 2009 Nanaimo Art Gallery. 32-page paperback. This biography was published to coincide with the release of a number of Giclée prints from the Estate of E.J. Hughes. 
EJ Hughes Paints Vancouver Island, by Robert Amos (2018), 204-page hardcover book published by TouchWood Editions.  The book was a finalist for the 2019 BC and Yukon Book Prize and the 2019 Victoria Book Prize.
E. J. Hughes Paints British Columbia, by Robert Amos (2019), 204-page hardcover book published by TouchWood Editions. 
The E.J. Hughes Book of Boats, by Robert Amos (2020), 88-page hardcover book publisher by TouchWood Editions.

Film
E.J. Hughes Restoration: Triumph over hard times," is a 2009 HD documentary on the life of EJ Hughes and the restoration of his Malaspina mural, a large 9x12 foot work of art now worth over 4 million dollars. The documentary was nominated for a Leo Award, and won a Gold Remi from the Huston International Film festival.

References

Bibliography

External links 
 Official site, retrieved on 15 May 2007.

1913 births
2007 deaths
Canadian male painters
Artists from British Columbia
Landscape artists
Members of the Order of Canada
Members of the Order of British Columbia
People from Nanaimo
People from North Vancouver
Emily Carr University of Art and Design alumni
Members of the Royal Canadian Academy of Arts
20th-century Canadian male artists
20th-century Canadian painters
21st-century Canadian male artists
21st-century Canadian painters
Canadian muralists